Padmanabhanagar is a posh residential locality in South Bangalore, India, covering an area of 1.68 km2 It's one of the zones of BBMP. Padmanabhanagar has a very famous park called Lakshmikanta Park. This park houses Lakshmi Kantha temple. It was looked after by residents association, in 2018 the corporator allotted funds and developed it further. The park was eyed for its medicinal trees and was sanctioned to be cut down completely and set up a landscaped area but the senior citizens of the locality who nurtured the park protested and stopped it. It is surrounded by Kumaraswamy Layout, Gowdanapalya, Chennamanakere, Kathriguppe, Kadirenahalli, Uttarahalli and Chikkakalasandra.

It is a constituency in the Karnataka legislative assembly. The assembly constituency has several areas surrounding Padmanabhanagara like Kumaraswamy Layout, Yediyur, Tyagarajanagara, Banashankari 2nd stage, Yarab Nagara, parts of Banashankari temple ward, Jayanagara 6th/7th/8th blocks, Shastri Nagara. The constituency is currently represented by Shri R Ashoka (Bharathiya Janata Party). Padmanabhanagara is also a ward constituency in BBMP (Bruhat Bengaluru Mahanagara Palike ward No. 182) which was represented by Smt. L Shobha Anjanappa of BJP (Bharathiya Janata Party), in the immediate past term.

Education
Among its educational institutions are:
 Carmel School
 Prarthana School
 Deccan International School
 Sri Kumarans Children's home(SKCH) Composite PU college
 Jnana Vijnana Vidya Peeta

Health
 Maharaja Agrasen Hospital (Bangalore)
 D.G Hospital
 Yogananda Multi Speciality Hospital
 Motherhood (opposite KIMS)
 Agarwal Eye Hospital
 Medall Clumax Diagnostics
 Hillside Hospital

Notable residents
 H.D. Deve Gowda, Janata Dal (Secular) leader and former Prime Minister of India
 Nissar Ahmed, Kannada writer

Transport
The area is well connected by the BMTC bus network.
Bus routes to Kempegowda Bus Terminus include 12B, 12C, 210N, 210NA, 210NB, 210ND, 210NF, 210P, 210J, 210KA, 210W, 210I.
Bus routes to KR Market  include 15A, 210N, 210NA.
Bus routes to Shivajinagara include 13B, 182, 210H.
Bus route to Bhoopasandra  - 279F.
Bus route to Kamala Nagara BEML Layout - TR-10 (210N-96D)
Nearest Namma Metro station is Banashankari (on the Green line).

References

External links 
 About Padmanabhanagar at Bangalorelookup

Neighbourhoods in Bangalore